Sal Leanti (born June 16, 1976) is a retired American soccer player who played three seasons in the USISL A-League.

Leanti attended the Fordham University, playing on the men's soccer team from 1994 to 1996.

On March 23, 1997, Leanti signed with the Long Island Rough Riders of the USISL A-League.  He played the 1997 and 1998 seasons with Long Island.  On February 1, 1998, the MetroStars selected Leanti in the third round (twenty-eight overall) of the 1998 MLS Supplemental Draft.  The MetroStars released him during the pre-season.  On April 1, 1999, Leanti moved to the Staten Island Vipers.  After retiring from professional soccer, Leanti continued to play amateur, most notably for the Silver Lake Soccer Club of Staten Island ,which competed in the Cosmopolitan Soccer League.

References

1976 births
Living people
American soccer players
Fordham Rams men's soccer players
Long Island Rough Riders players
Staten Island Vipers players
A-League (1995–2004) players
New York Red Bulls draft picks
Association football defenders
Association football midfielders